KTNM (1400 AM) is a radio station broadcasting a Country music format. Licensed to Tucumcari, New Mexico, United States, the station is currently owned by Ingalls Holdings, LLC.

References

External links

Country radio stations in the United States
TNM